Wyaralong is a rural locality in the Scenic Rim Region, Queensland, Australia.

Geography 
The Wyaralong Dam was built across Teviot Brook, a tributary of the Logan River. The dam wall is partly in Wyaralong and partly in neighbouring Allenview. Its impoundment, Lake Wyaralong, is mostly within Wyaralong but some is within Allenview where the public access area is located.

The Beaudesert–Boonah Road (State Route 90) runs through the locality from south-east (Bromelton) to south (Coulson). It passes to the south of the lake.

The land use is predominantly grazing on native vegetation, except for some areas of plantation forestry.

History 

Wyaralong Provisional School opened on 30 June 1924 but closed in 1929 due to low numbers of students. It operated from a cottage on the Wyaralong pastoral station provided by Mr and Mrs Colin John Campbell Philp.

Wyaralong State School opened on 14 February 1938. Miss T. D. Dengle was the first teacher. The school was officially opened on Friday 11 March 1938 by Minister for Public Instruction, Frank Cooper. The school closed in 1949 but re-opened in 1956. It closed permanently on 18 July 1965. The school was located south of (the now) Old Beaudesert Road (approx ); the route of the road between Boonah and Beaudesert has been changed to avoid the inundation created by the dam.

In 1940, the area was used for air gunnery practice exercises, the first in Queensland.

The Wyaralong Dam was completed in 1911.

Economy 
There are a number of homesteads in the locality:

 Alanmere
 Banjora
 Glen Retreal
 The Overflow
 Wyaralong

Education 
There are no schools in Wyaralong. The nearest government primary schools are Roadvale State School in neighbouring Roadvale to the west, Gleneagle State School in Gleneagle to the east, and Boonah State School in Boonah to the south-west. The nearest government secondary schools are Boonah State High School in Boonah to the south-west and Beaudesert State High School in Beaudesert to the east.

References 

Scenic Rim Region
Localities in Queensland